Tosca Reno (born May 22, 1959) is a New York Times best selling author who has written Your Best Body Now and the Eat-Clean Diet series. She is a certified Nutritional Therapy Practitioner.

Reno a leading health and wellness advocate. She is the New York Times' Best Selling Author of Your Best Body Now and her Eat-Clean Diet® series has sold well over a million copies. In the 11 book series she has translated "healthy eating" into an easily adaptable and enjoyable lifestyle leading to a life free of disease and illness and full of happiness, balance and success. Tosca Reno has inspired many North American men and women to live the best life they can lead.

Personal life
Reno is the widow of Robert Kennedy who founded Robert Kennedy Publishing in 1974 with the launch of MuscleMag International and was also an accomplished artist and art teacher. Reno and Kennedy met on a school playground where Reno taught Kennedy's daughter. Reno, a mother of three, was getting divorced; and the two started a relationship.  Kennedy died of lung cancer on April 12, 2012.

Following Kennedy's death Reno assumed the position of publisher and chief executive officer at Robert Kennedy Publishing.

Publishing
Reno first began writing a monthly column for Oxygen and has since published 11 books with Robert Kennedy Publishing's book division, including the popular Eat-Clean Diet Series. In 2010 she became a New York Times bestselling author with her book Your Best Body Now: Look and Feel Fabulous at Any Age the Eat-Clean Way.

Television
Tosca was featured in a mini-reality series called Tosca: Flexing at 49 in 2009. The eight-part series focused on her preparations for the final bodybuilding competition of her career. The series aired on the Viva Network in Canada in June, 2009.

Published works
"The Pan-G Non-Surgical Face Lift" (2006)
The Butt Book (2007)
The Eat-Clean Diet Book (2007)
The Eat-Clean Diet Cookbook (2007)
The Eat-Clean Diet Workout (2008)
The Eat-Clean Diet Workout Journal (2008)
The Eat-Clean Diet for Family and Kids (2008)
The Eat-Clean Diet for Men (2009)
The Eat-Clean Diet Companion (2009)
Tosca Reno's Eat Clean Cookbook (2009)
The Eat-Clean Diet Recharged (2009)
Your Best Body Now (2009)
The Eat-Clean Diet Stripped (2011)
The Eat-Clean Diet Vegetarian Cookbook (2012)
"Just the Rules" (2012)
"The Start Here Diet" (2013)

See also 
 List of diets

References

External links
Tosca Reno's official website

1959 births
Living people
Canadian health and wellness writers
Clean eating advocates
People from Lachine, Quebec
Writers from Montreal
Queen's University at Kingston alumni
York University alumni
Canadian nutritionists
Vegetarian cookbook writers
Women nutritionists